Burl Ives Sings... For Fun  is a 1956 album by American folk singer Burl Ives.

Reception

In his Allmusic review, critic Bruce Eder wrote of the album: "The mood is lighthearted, but it's not all wafting innocuous melodies, as "Goober Peas" calls up some serious echoes."

Track listing

References

Burl Ives albums
1956 albums
Decca Records albums